Alchemilla hirsuticaulis is a species of plants belonging to the family Rosaceae.

It is native to Northern Europe, Eastern Europe to Western Siberia.

References

hirsuticaulis